The English suffix -nik is of Slavic origin. It approximately corresponds to the suffix "-er" and nearly always denotes an agent noun (that is, it describes a person related to the thing, state, habit, or action described by the word to which the suffix is attached). In the cases where a native English language coinage may occur, the "-nik"-word often bears an ironic connotation.

History
The suffix existed in English in a dormant state for a long time, in borrowed terms. An example is raskolnik, recorded by the Oxford English Dictionary as known since 1723. There have been two main waves of the introduction of this suffix into English language. The first was driven by Yinglish words contributed by Yiddish speakers from Eastern Europe. The second surge was observed after the launch of the first Sputnik satellite by the Soviet Union on October 4, 1957.

In his book The American Language, first published in 1919, H. L. Mencken (1880–1956) credited the mania for adding "-nik" to the ends of adjectives to create nouns to Al Capp's American comic strip Li'l Abner (1934–1977) rather than to the influence of "Sputnik", first recorded in 1957, or "beatnik", first recorded in 1958.

Vocabulary

Mainstream
Words of significant context or usage:
Beatnik
Chainik
Refusenik
Sputnik

Casual
Casual neologisms:
 Alrightnik: one who has been successful; nouveau riche
Artnik, a UK publisher (defunct); the word predates its establishment
 Computernik: a computer geek 
 Holdupnik: a robber
 Muttnik, the first dog in space
 Neatnik: a neat-freak 
 Nogoodnik: a lazy, incompetent or malicious person
 Peacenik: a pacifist; a hippie 
 Rudenik: a rude person
Wordnik

Jewish adaptation
Words originally used by Jews of Europe, America, and Israel, often referring to concepts related to their experiences or things happening in Israel or among the Jewish people:
Chabadnik or Habadnik: follower of Chabad
Jobnik: a non-combat soldier who performs secretarial work
Kadimanik: member of United Synagogue Youth's Kadima program
Ka-tzetnik: a Nazi concentration camp prisoner or survivor, derived from abbreviation KZ, pronounced "Ka-tzet"
Kibbutznik: member of a Kibbutz
Lamedvavnik
Likudnik: supporter of Israeli political party Likud
Limmudnik: participant or attendee of Limmud events
Mapainik: supporter of the historical Israeli labor party
Moshavnik: member of a Moshav
Mossadnik: Mossad agent
Netzernik: Member of the Netzer Olami youth movement
Nudnik: a nagging, boring or awkward person
Shinuinik: supporter of Israeli political party Shinui
Subbotnik: Russian religious movements of Christian origin, whom majority belonged to Rabbinic and Karaite Judaism

Slavic languages
Native or constructed Slavic words originating in Slavic-speaking environments:

Borovnik
Borownik
Buntovnik
Čelnik
Chetnik
Drežnik
Druzhinnik
Dubník
Dubrovnik
Gopnik
Hutnik
Jamnik
Jarnik
Kolkhoznik
Kukuruznik
Lipnik
Miednik
Mielnik
Narodnik
Namestnik
Okhotnik
Oprichnik
Patatnik
Peredvizhnik
Poglavnik
Polkovnik, the commander of a polk (regiment)
Posadnik
Prątnik
Raskolnik
Robotnik
Rodnik
Sotnik
Sovkhoznik (derived from the Soviet-constructed word sovkhoz)
Subbotnik
Syrnik
Travnik
Udarnik
Varenik
Vatnik
Vodnik
Voskresnik
Varenik
Wapnik
Zapadnik
Zolotnik, an obsolete Russian measure of weight

References

External links

Nik
Slavic languages